Marlon Piñero is a former Philippine international footballer. He has also played for Philippine Navy and Dumaguete.

International goals
Scores and results list the Philippines' goal tally first.

References

External links
 
 

1972 births
Living people
Filipino footballers
Association football forwards
Philippines international footballers
People from Dumaguete
Footballers from Negros Oriental